Oskar Erbslöh (21 April 1879 – 13 July 1910) was a German aviation pioneer.

Early life
Erbslöh came from a family of merchants in Elberfeld. His father, Carl Emil Erbslöh, ran a manufacturing business there. Around 1900 he gained business experience abroad and traveled to North America. He turned early to various sports and in 1904 to ballooning in particular. After fulfilling his military duty, in 1905 he joined the family business as a partner.

Work
In 1905 Erbslöh was named Ballonführer of the Niederrheinischer Verein für Luftschifffahrt (Lower Rhine Airship Club), which had been founded in 1902. In 1906 he won first prizes in several national ballooning races. On 30 September 1906, at the first Gordon Bennett Cup, Erbslöh took ninth place along with Hugo von Abercron in the balloon Düsseldorf. On 15 September 1907, Erbslöh won the international race of the Fédération Aéronautique Internationale, for which he received not only the winner's trophy but a golden plaque from Fédération founder Prince Roland Bonaparte, which helped him to greater international fame.

On October 21, 1907, at the second Gordon Bennett Cup in St. Louis, Erbslöh and his companion Henry Helm Clayton won first place, traveling 1403.55 kilometers over 40 hours in his balloon Pomerania.

In 1908 Erbslöh turned from ballooning to motorized air sports. Under his chairmanship was founded the Rheinisch-Westfälische Motorluftschiff-Gesellschaft, whose purpose was the construction of powered airships. In 1909, the company built an airship hangar 20 acres of land leased from the town of Leichlingen. Simultaneously with the construction of the hangar began the construction of the airship Erbslöh.

Also in 1909, Erbslöh piloted the balloon Berlin in a 30-hour voyage over the Alps.

On 13 July 1910, Erbslöh died in the crash of the Erbslöh, when the benzine tank of its gasoline-powered engine exploded at an altitude of 480 meters over Pattscheid. The airship had recently been refitted for passenger service. Erbslöh's death came only one day after the death of his friend, British aviation pioneer Charles Rolls.

The New York Times reported in July 1910 that at Oskar's funeral his own father had had a stroke and died, but this contradicts the family company's own statement (in 1914) that the elder Erbslöh had in fact died ten months afterward.

Honors
In 1913, the city of Leichlingen asked Kaiser Wilhelm II for permission to display the airship Erbslöh in the city's coat of arms. Wilhelm rejected the city's request.

A monument to Erbslöh stands in Leichlingen near the eponymous Oskar-Erbslöh-Straße. Other streets named after Erbslöh are in Wuppertal, Solingen, Essen, and Langenfeld. The Langenfeld aero club is named for Erbslöh. On August 24, 2011, the municipal council of Schönefeld named a street in the entrance area of Berlin Brandenburg Airport after Oskar Erbslöh.

Erbslöh's grave is located in the Friedhof Hochstraße, an Old Lutheran cemetery in Wuppertal.

References

Further reading
 Gustav von Eynern: Nachrichten über die Familie Erbslöh. Lintz, Düsseldorf 1905 (Bibliothek des Bergischen Geschichtsvereins innerhalb der Stadtbibliothek Wuppertal-Elberfeld)
 Illustrierte Aeronautische Mitteilungen. Deutsche Zeitschrift für Luftschiffahrt. Amtliches Organ des Deutschen Luftschiffer-Verbandes, Heft 10/11, XI. Jahrgang, Straßburg-Berlin 1907.
 Deutschland in den Lüften voran! Oskar Erbslöh, Sieger im Gordon-Bennet-Rennen in St. Louis. In: Die Woche. Nr. 45, 9 November 1907, August Scherl, Berlin 1907, S. 1967 und 1969 f.
 Oskar Erbslöh: Bericht über die Siegesfahrt. In: Aeronautischer Kalender. I. Jahrgang, J. Rieken, Berlin 1908, S. 65–95.
 Oskar Erbslöh: Der deutsche Gordon-Bennett-Sieg 1907. In: Bröckelmann (Hrsg.): Wir Luftschiffer. Ullstein, Berlin/ Wien 1909, S. 105–116.
 Das Platzen der Stoffluftschiffe. In: Im Reich der Lüfte. Deutschland voran. III. Jahrgang, Nr. 15, 10 August 1910, Verlag Emil Pilger Nachf., Berlin 1910.
 Die Katastrophe von Leichlingen. In: Berliner Tageblatt. 39. Jahrgang, Nr. 352, 14. Juli, Berlin 1910.
 Der Absturz des Lenkballons „Erbslöh". In: Süddeutsche Illustrierte Zeitung. 5. Jahrgang, Nr. 31, 31 July 1910, Heilbronn 1910, S. 483 ff.
 Saurin-Sorani: Oskar Erbslöh mit dem Gordon-Bennett-Preis der Lüfte 1907. In: Bergische Heimat. Band 5, Nummer 10, Verlag Ernst Scholl, Ronsdorf 1931, S. 239.
 Hans Werner Hinrichs: Erbslöh" explodierte im Morgennebel. In: Westdeutsche Rundschau. Wuppertal, 8 July 1960.
 G. Schmitt, W. Schwipps: Pioniere der frühen Luftfahrt. Gondrom Verlag, Bindlach 1995, .
 Erich Schroeder: Oskar Erbslöh, ein rheinischer Luftfahrt-Pionier. Deutscher Aero-Philatelisten Club e.V., Köln 1997.
 Erbslöh-Archiv. Familienverband Julius Erbslöh, Wuppertal, Springe 2008.
 Uwe Boelken: Rheinische Luftschifffahrtsgeschichte in Leichlingen. Zur Erinnerung an den Absturz des Luftschiffes Erbslöh 13 July 1910. Stadt Leichlingen (Hrsg. und Verleger), Leichlingen 2010.
 Karl-Hugo Dierichs: Der Tod kam aus der Nebelwand. Erbslöhs Absturz. In: Bergische Blätter. 33. Jg., 3 July 2010, Wuppertal 2010, S. 7–9.
 Andreas Erbslöh: Das Luftschiff „Erbslöh". In: Andreas Erbslöh: Familienverband Julius Erbslöh. Eine Zeitreise. Hannover 2014, S. 125 f.

External links

 Hans Werner Hinrichs: „Erbslöh" explodierte im Morgennebel. In: Westdeutsche Rundschau. 8 July 1960. (auf einer Internetseite des Familienverbands Erbslöh)
 Christoph Kaltscheuer: Oskar Erbslöh (1879–1910), Luftfahrtpionier. Lebenslauf. Portal Rheinische Geschichte des Landschaftsverbandes Rheinland

1879 births
1910 deaths
Aviation pioneers
Aviators killed in aviation accidents or incidents in Germany
German airship aviators
German balloonists
People from Elberfeld
Victims of aviation accidents or incidents in 1910